Tum Kitem Kortolo Aslo? is a 2010 Indian Konkani language film written and directed by Sharon Mazarello. The film also features Mazarello in the lead role. The story is about infidelity, from the perspective  of the woman. It was produced by Mazarello and her husband, Wilmix Mazarello, under the banner of ShaMaz Films. The film premiered at the Cinescope Metro in Kuwait on 22 October 2010, marking the 60th anniversary of the release of Mogacho Anvddo, the first Konkani film. With this film, Mazarello became the first woman to direct a Konkani movie.

Plot
Shaina (Sharon Mazarello) and Johnny (Pradip Naik) are a newly wed couple. Johnny always goes abroad for long trips, leaving his wife behind. She then bonds with Johnny's good friend Sammy (Franky Gonsalves), and she eventually ends up cheating on Johnny with Sammy.

Cast 
Main cast
 Sharon Mazarello as Shaina
 Pradip Naik as Johnny
 Franky Gonsalves as Sammy

Supporting cast
 Effie Fernandes
 Fermeeno Goes
 Humbert Fernandes
 Wilson Mazarello
 Bobet Fernandes
 Claron Mazarello
 Eddison Fernandes
 Frazeo Fernandes
 Jose Mario Fernandes
 Remmie Fernandes
 Elvis Mascarenhas

Accolades
The film was greatly appreciated at the Colour Of The Nile International Film Festival in Africa, the Addis International Film Festival, Ethiopia, 2011 and the Marbella International Film Festival, Spain, 2011. It was also screened at the 42nd International Film Festival of India. In 2014, on the occasion of Konkani Cinema Day, the film was selected for a special screening by the Dalgado Konknni Akademi.

See also
 Paltadacho Munis
 Nachom-ia Kumpasar

References

External links 
 

2010 films
Films set in Goa
Films shot in Goa
2010s Konkani-language films